Jill, Lady Hoare (born 15 October 1933) is a British computer scientist and one of the primary developers on the initial compiler for the ALGOL 60 language, developed for Elliott Brothers in 1963.

Hoare was born Jill Pym. She is the daughter of Lieutenant Colonel John Pym and Diana Gough. She married Sir Charles Antony Richard Hoare on 13 January 1962. The couple had three children.

After working on ALGOL, Hoare worked on hospital systems for NHS Oxfordshire.

References

1933 births
Living people
British computer programmers
British software engineers
British women computer scientists
Wives of knights